Jill Bargonetti is an American professor at the City University of New York with dual appointments at Hunter College and The Graduate Center. Her research is focused on tumor suppressor protein p53 and its role as an oncogene when it is mutated in breast cancer.

Early life and education 
Born on October 10, 1962, in New York Hospital, Jill Bargonetti is the daughter of Adah Askew and Arthur Bargonetti. Jill was the product of an interracial union between a Black mother and an Italian American father. She grew up in a strategically multi-ethnic and culturally diverse Mitchel-Lama housing development on Manhattan’s Upper West Side. Bargonetti attended three of New York City’s special public schools: Hunter College Elementary School, Hunter College High School and The Bronx High School of Science. She went on to attend the State University of New York at Purchase where she majored in biology and dance and earned a B.A. in Biology. She then received her Masters from New York University in 1987 followed by her Ph.D. from NYU in 1990. She did a postdoctoral fellowship at Columbia University from 1990 until 1994, where she worked alongside Dr. Carol Prives. There, she characterized important functions of p53 needed for tumor suppression and that they were lost when p53 is mutated in cancer.

Career 
Bargonetti’s first professional positions in the 1980s were as a dancer with a Harlem-based dance company called Dianne McIntyre’s Sounds in Motion and as a research technician at Rockefeller University. Following her doctoral and postdoctoral training, in 1994 Bargonetti became an assistant professor at The City University of New York with appointments at Hunter College and The Graduate Center. She chose the City University of New York in part to be a role model for other people from groups underrepresented in the sciences. In 1997, she was awarded the Presidential Early Career Award for Scientists and Engineers from President Bill Clinton for “scholarly work in cancer related studies of cell growth and gene expression and involvement of undergraduate, graduate and especially minority students in the discovery process.”  She became a full professor at Hunter College in 2007 and the Chair of the MCD PhD subprogram of the CUNY Graduate Center in 2009.

Bargonetti has served on numerous National Committee’s to evaluate science and policy. Some of her appointments include a 2012-2018 Membership in The National Institutes of Health (NIH) Tumor Cell Biology Study Section Review Committee and a working as a member of The National Cancer Policy Board from 2002 to 2005.

Bargonetti was featured on a PBS series called "American Graduate Day" in 2015. Additionally, she spoke at a TedX "Borders and Belonging" event at City University of New York (CUNY) in 2016. She was noted as a New York University Graduate School of Arts and Sciences: Distinguished Alumna  and a SUNY Purchase Presidential Distinguished Alumna. In 2017, Jill Bargonetti was inducted into the Bronx Science High School Hall of Fame.

Honors and awards 

 Presidential Early Career Award for Scientists and Engineers, from President Bill Clinton
 The New York City Mayor’s Award for Excellence in Science and Technology
 New York Voice Award
 Kathy Keeton Mountain Top Award from the New York branch of the NAACP
 Outstanding Woman Scientist Award from the Association for Women in Science
 Bronx Science High School Hall of Fame.

References 

1962 births
Living people
Hunter College faculty
New York University alumni
American medical researchers
The Bronx High School of Science alumni
State University of New York at Purchase alumni
Scientists from New York City
Recipients of the Presidential Early Career Award for Scientists and Engineers